Alexander Hamilton (March 18, 1851 - February 4, 1916) was a railroad lawyer and businessman, who served as a president of The Virginia Bar Association, and as a delegate to the Virginia Constitutional Convention of 1901-1902.

Biography
Alexander Hamilton was born in Williamsboro, North Carolina on March 18, 1851. He graduated from the Virginia Military Institute in 1871, and was an assistant professor of Latin and tactics there for two years.

He was married three times, to Mary Stuart Donnan, Kate M. Venable, and Helen Leslie McGill.

He died at his home in Petersburg, Virginia on February 4, 1916, and was buried at Blandford Cemetery.

References

Virginia lawyers
Delegates to Virginia Constitutional Convention of 1901
20th-century American politicians
1851 births
1916 deaths
19th-century American lawyers
Burials at Blandford Cemetery
Virginia Military Institute alumni